The naked-faced barbet (Gymnobucco calvus) is a bird species in the family Lybiidae (the African barbets). It used to be placed in the family Bucconidae (puffbirds), which has been split up; alternatively, it may be included in a vastly expanded Ramphastidae (toucans).

It is found in Angola, Benin, Cameroon, Republic of the Congo, DRC, Ivory Coast, Equatorial Guinea, Gabon, Ghana, Guinea, Liberia, Nigeria, Sierra Leone, and Togo.

References

naked-faced barbet
Birds of Sub-Saharan Africa
naked-faced barbet
Taxonomy articles created by Polbot